By Hook or Crook is a 1918 American silent comedy film directed by Dell Henderson and starring Carlyle Blackwell, Evelyn Greeley and Jack Drumier. It was shot at Fort Lee, New Jersey.

Cast
 Carlyle Blackwell as Frederic Pritchard
 Evelyn Greeley as Gloria Nevins
 Jack Drumier as Frederic Pritchard Sr.
 Frank Doane as Smithson
 Jennie Ellison as Mrs. Pritchard
 Nora Cecil as Aunt Marie
 Alice Chapin as Mrs. Nevins
 Henry Warwick as Henry Arnold

References

Bibliography
 Altomara, Rita Ecke. Hollywood on the Palisades: A Filmography of Silent Features Made in Fort Lee, New Jersey, 1903-1927. Garland Pub, 1983. 
 Connelly, Robert B. The Silents: Silent Feature Films, 1910-36, Volume 40, Issue 2. December Press, 1998.
 Munden, Kenneth White. The American Film Institute Catalog of Motion Pictures Produced in the United States, Part 1. University of California Press, 1997.

External links
 

1918 films
1918 comedy films
1910s English-language films
American silent feature films
Silent American comedy films
American black-and-white films
Films directed by Dell Henderson
World Film Company films
1910s American films